The 2001–02 Süper Lig was the 44th edition of top-flight professional football in Turkey. Galatasaray S.K. became champions for the 15th time. Turkish First Football League was renamed as Turkish Super League in this season.

Turkey climbed from eleventh to seventh place in the UEFA association coefficient rankings at the end of the 2000–01 season, that means the league has gained additional two spots for the UEFA Cup and for the first time, the champions will now enter the group stage of the UEFA Champions League instead of having to compete in the qualifying rounds.

After beating cup winners Kocaelispor 4–0 at home last week, Denizlispor qualified for the first time to the UEFA Cup in their history.

Final league table

Results

Top scorers

References
Turkish-Soccer.com by Erdinç Sivritepe

Süper Lig seasons
Turkey
1